Alys Beach is an unincorporated planned community in Walton County, Florida, United States directly off of CR 30A, on the Gulf Coast. Alys Beach plan was designed by Duany Plater-Zyberk & Company.

Location

Alys Beach is located on the Gulf of Mexico in southeastern Walton County. U.S. Route 98 and County Road 30A are the main roads that run through the community.

Design 
Alys Beach is one of three planned communities on Florida's Gulf coast designed by Andrés Duany and Elizabeth Plater-Zyberk. The other two are Seaside and Rosemary Beach. The three are examples of a style of urban planning known as New Urbanism. The design vision of Alys Beach was based on Moorish and Mediterranean villages and architectural styles of Bermuda. The courtyard's design was inspired by homes in Antigua and Guatemala. The Alys Beach community is constructed following the Fortified for Safer Living standards by the Insurance Institute for Business and Home Safety.

History 
Alys Beach modern history began in 1970s, when the Stephens family purchased the  property at auction. The family had been vacationing in the area for many years, and wanted to provide a permanent retreat for an extended family and their employees. Family patriarch Elton Stephens named estate after his beloved, Alys Robinson Stephens (1910–1996).

See also 
 Alys Robinson Stephens Performing Arts Center
 Seaside, Florida
 Rosemary Beach, Florida
 Celebration, Florida
 Golden Oak at Walt Disney World Resort
 New Urbanism

References 

Unincorporated communities in Walton County, Florida
New Urbanism communities
Populated places established in 2004
Unincorporated communities in Florida
Populated coastal places in Florida on the Gulf of Mexico
Planned communities in Florida
New Classical architecture